Light University is a private Baptist university located at Port-au-Prince, Haiti. It is affiliated with the Evangelical Baptist Mission of South Haiti.

History
The University was founded in 1993 in Les Cayes by the Evangelical Baptist Mission of South Haiti.  In 2018, it had 37 faculties in 8 cities across the country.

References

External links
 Official Website

Baptist universities and colleges
Baptist Christianity in Haiti
Universities in Haiti